Muensterellidae is a family of stem-octopod cephalopods from the Late Jurassic to Late Cretaceous.

Phylogeny

Muensterellidae is one of two families in the superfamily Muensterelloidea along with the Patelloctopodidae. The muensterelloids are characterized by having a roughly spoon-shaped end of the gladius called the patella. This type of gladius is likely ancestral to the gladius remnants of modern octopuses.

References

Octopuses
Prehistoric cephalopod families